Brier Knob is a mountain in the North Carolina High Country, at the Linville community.  It is wholly in the Pisgah National Forest.  Its elevation reaches .  Feeder streams from the mountain flow directly into the Linville River.

Brier Knob is considered the northern limit of Linville, it is flanked by NC 105 to the east and West Fork Road to the west.  Unlike other mountains that surround it, there is not development on the summit of Brier Knob.

References

Mountains of North Carolina
Mountains of Avery County, North Carolina